= Busang Rasefako =

Motswana footballer

Personal information
- Full name: Busang Rasefako
- Date of birth: 17 March 1972 (age 54)
- Place of birth: Botswana
- Position: Midfielder

Senior career*
Years	Team	Apps	(Gls)
1999–2007	Jwaneng Comets		

International career
2000–2003	Botswana	9	(0)
- * Club domestic league appearances and goals

Busang Rasefako (born 17 March 1972) is a Motswana former footballer who played as a midfielder. He played for the Botswana national football team between 2000 and 2003.
